Weronika Gawlik (born 20 October 1986) is a Polish handball player for MKS Lublin and the Polish national team.

She competed at the 2015 World Women's Handball Championship in Denmark.

International honours 
Carpathian Trophy:
Winner: 2017

References

External links

1986 births
Living people
Polish female handball players
Sportspeople from Gliwice